Corner Shot Holdings, LLC is an American company headquartered in Miami, Florida that markets a device for "corner observation" and sniping.  

CornerShot was  founded by two former senior officers from elite units of the Israeli Defense Forces together with US investors. The company was founded to market a device known as the CornerShot to militaries and law enforcement agencies around the world.

References 

Defense companies of the United States
Companies based in Miami